Seren Şirince born on March 15, 1991, is a Turkish actress based in Istanbul and New York. She graduated from Yeditepe University in 2017, where she studied a BFA in Theatre. Her professional career began during her university education when she played the role of "Lucy" in "The Water's Edge" at the Talimhane Theater Company. Since university, Seren has starred in a number of high-profile television, film, and commercial productions, and is best known for her role as "Aysegul Dinc" in the Turkish romantic comedy series "Iliski Durumu: Karisik." Seren was awarded "Best Comedy Female Actor of the Year" at the 2017 Yeditepe University Awards. 

In television, Seren is known for her starring roles as "Derya" in "Bir Aile Hikayesi," the Turkish adaptation of the US series "This is Us". In film, Seren has had leading roles in the feature film "Bucur" and the short film "Black Sun," which was awarded "The Best International Short Film" at the Locarno Film Festival. More recently, Seren played "Caprice" in the BKM theatre production "The Comedy About a Bank Robbery," directed by Lerzan Pamir. In 2021, Seren pursued further education in the Hagen Core program at HB Studio and Stella Adler in New York.

Filmography

Advertisements

Awards

References

External links 
 

1991 births
Turkish television actresses
Actresses from İzmir
Living people